The Mangakahia River is a river of the Northland Region of New Zealand's North Island. It is joined by the Opouteke River near Pakotai, then turns east, until it is joined by the Hikurangi River. It then turns south again, passing Titoki and then joining with the Wairua River to form the Wairoa River approximately halfway between Whangarei and Dargaville.

The New Zealand Ministry for Culture and Heritage gives a translation of "stream of the New Zealand passionfruit vine" for Mangakāhia.

See also
List of rivers of New Zealand

References

External links

Rivers of the Northland Region
Rivers of New Zealand
Kaipara Harbour catchment